No'o Taru (née Tekeu, 25 April 1960 – 2011) is a former New Zealand rugby union player. She made her debut for the Black Ferns on 1 September 1990 against a World XV's team at RugbyFest 1990. However, due to incorrect record keeping and lack of official endorsement then, it is unclear how many games she played for the New Zealand XV.

Death 
Taru died in 2011 due to cancer and was survived by her husband and five children.

References 

1960 births
2011 deaths
New Zealand female rugby union players
New Zealand women's international rugby union players